The water polo tournament at the 1976 Summer Olympics was held from 18 to 27 July 1976 in Montreal, Quebec, Canada.

Qualification

Medalists

Participating teams

Group A

 
 

Group B
 
 

 

Group C

Squads

Preliminary round

Group A

18 July 1976

19 July 1976

20 July 1976

Group B

18 July 1976

19 July 1976

20 July 1976

Group C

18 July 1976

19 July 1976

20 July 1976

Classification round

Group D

22 July 1976

23 July 1976

24 July 1976

26 July 1976

27 July 1976

1 The Soviet Union forfeited the match due to player illness.

Group E

22 July 1976

23 July 1976

24 July 1976

26 July 1976

27 July 1976

Final ranking

See also
1975 FINA Men's World Water Polo Championship
1978 FINA Men's World Water Polo Championship

References

Sources
 PDF documents in the LA84 Foundation Digital Library:
 Official Report of the 1976 Olympic Games, v.3 (download, archive) (pp. 446–447, 484–497)
 Water polo on the Olympedia website
 Water polo at the 1976 Summer Olympics (men's tournament)
 Water polo on the Sports Reference website
 Water polo at the 1976 Summer Games (men's tournament) (archived)

External links

 Results

 
1976 Summer Olympics events
O
1976
1976